The Patel Chowk Metro Station is located on the Yellow Line of the Delhi Metro.

It is the southernmost station on the Yellow Line in Delhi to have parking facilities. Cycles are also available for rent. It houses the Metro Museum, which opened in 2010. The "Delhi Metro Rail Museum" is located at the concourse area of this station. This station is used for accessing places like Gurdwara Bangla Sahib, Kerala Bhawan, RML Hospital, Jantar Mantar, YMCA, YWCA and several major Govt offices like Dak Bhawan, Sanchar Bhawan, RBI Delhi, PTI, Yojana Bhawan, Akashvani Delhi, Election Commission of India etc.
thumb|An eight-coach train leaves from Patel Chowk Metro Station

Station layout

See also
List of Delhi Metro stations
Transport in Delhi

References

External links

 Delhi Metro Rail Corporation Ltd. (Official site) 
 Delhi Metro Annual Reports
 

Delhi Metro stations
Railway stations opened in 2005
Railway stations in New Delhi district
2005 establishments in Delhi